George Stockton (1905 – 1963) was an English footballer who played at inside-right for Chesterton, Leicestershire Regiment, West Bromwich Albion, and Port Vale. He helped the "Valiants" to win the Third Division North title in 1929–30.

Career
Stockton played for Chesterton, the Leicester Regiment (in two spells) and West Bromwich Albion, before joining Port Vale in July 1929. He made six Third Division North appearances in the title winning campaign in 1929–30. He scored in a 4–2 defeat by Stockport County at Edgeley Park (Boxing day), a 3–0 win over Halifax Town at The Old Recreation Ground (28 December), and scored a brace in a 3–0 win over Wrexham (18 January). Despite this, he was not selected again after the Wrexham game, and was released at the end of the season.

He joined Cheshire County League club Macclesfield, making his debut on 2 September 1931 against Northwich Victoria. He served as a utility player at Moss Rose, playing mostly on the front line or at left-back as required. He helped the "Silkmen" to the league titles in both the 1931–32 and 1932–33 campaigns and gained a winners' medal in the Challenge Cup competition in 1932; he also represented the Cheshire League side against the Welsh National League. He was given a free transfer to Stalybridge Celtic at the end of September 1934.

Career statistics
Source:

Honours
Port Vale
Football League Third Division North: 1929–30

Macclesfield
Cheshire County League: 1931–32 & 1932–33

References

1905 births
1963 deaths
Sportspeople from Newcastle-under-Lyme
English footballers
Association football forwards
West Bromwich Albion F.C. players
Port Vale F.C. players
Macclesfield Town F.C. players
Stalybridge Celtic F.C. players
English Football League players